The Minister of Agriculture, Food Sovereignty and Forests is the head of the Republic of Italy's Ministry of Agricultural, Food and Forestry Policies. The ministry had been abolished by legislative referendum in 1993, during a period of great upheaval and financial sacrifices, but it was reconstituted in the same year until it assumed the current name in 2006.

The current Minister of the is Francesco Lollobrigida, of the Brothers of Italy party, who he is serving since 22 October 2022, in the government of Giorgia Meloni.

List of Ministers of Agriculture

Parties:

Coalitions:

Timeline

References

Agriculture
Forestry in Italy